Macellolophus is a genus of millipedes belonging to the family Xystodesmidae.

The species of this genus are found in Spain, Gibraltar, and North Africa.

Species
There are two species:
Macellolophus diadema  – status uncertain
Macellolophus rubromarginatus

References

Xystodesmidae
Myriapod genera
Millipedes of Africa
Millipedes of Europe